The main subdivision in Iraq is the 18 muhafazah, also known as governorates. Before 1976 they were called liwas, or banner.

Under the Constitution of Iraq adopted in 2005, one or more provinces may elect to form a Region, which has the right to a share of oil revenues.

Modern Iraq mostly covers the Ottoman Empire vilayets (provinces) of Baghdad, Basra and Mosul and part of Zor and Arabia.

The governorates are divided into districts.

References

See also
Regions of Iraq
Governorates of Iraq
Districts of Iraq
Subdistricts of Iraq
List of postal codes in Iraq

Subdivisions of Iraq